Tjøtta may refer to:

People
Jacqueline Naze Tjøtta, a French-born mathematician who settled in Norway and became the first female mathematical sciences professor in Norway
Hárek of Tjøtta, a Norwegian farmer and local chieftain

Places
Tjøtta, a village in Alstahaug Municipality in Nordland county, Norway
Tjøtta (municipality), a former municipality in Nordland county, Norway
Tjøtta (island), an island in Nordland county, Norway
Tjøtta Church, a church in Alstahaug Municipality in Nordland county, Norway
Tjøtta International War Cemetery, a war cemetery on the island of Tjøtta in Nordland county, Norway
Tjøtta Russian War Cemetery, a war cemetery on the island of Tjøtta in Nordland county, Norway